High Park was a federal electoral district in the west-end of the old City of Toronto, in  Ontario, Canada. It was represented in the House of Commons of Canada from 1935 to 1972. It was created in 1933 and abolished in 1972, when it was redistributed into the newly created High Park—Humber Valley district, which shared virtually the same boundaries as High Park's last incarnation.

History

The federal riding was created in 1933 from the former riding of Toronto—High Park. It was initially defined to consist of ward seven of the city of Toronto — that was the former City of West Toronto Junction — and the part of ward six lying west of a line drawn from north to south along Indian Road, east along Howard Park Avenue, and south along Sunnyside Avenue to Lake Ontario. In 1952, it was redefined to include the Ellis Court Apartments.

In 1966, a major redistribution included the former village of Swansea and parts of Etobicoke for the first time, and not following just the old City of West Toronto Junction boundaries as it had previously. It was defined to consist of the part of Metropolitan Toronto bounded on the south by Lake Ontario, and on the east, north and west by a line drawn north along Parkside Drive, west along Bloor Street West, north on Pacific Avenue, east along Canadian Pacific Railway, north along Keele Street, west along Rogers Road, northwest along Weston Road, west along Black Creek, south along Jane Street, southwest along Dundas Street, southeast along Mimico Creek, east along The Queensway, and southeast along the Humber River to the shore of Lake Ontario.

The electoral district was abolished in 1972 when the name of the electoral district was changed to High Park—Humber Valley with the same borders as the 1966 redistribution.

Members of Parliament

Alexander James Anderson, Conservative, (1935–1945)
William Alexander McMaster, Progressive Conservative, (1945–1949)
Pat Cameron, Liberal, (1949–1957)
John Kucherepa, Progressive Conservative, (1957–1962)
Pat Cameron, Liberal, (1962–1968)
Walter Deakon, Liberal, (1968–1972)

Federal election results

|}

|}

|}

|}

|}

|}

|}

|}

|}

|}

|}

See also 

 List of Canadian federal electoral districts
 Past Canadian electoral districts

References

Former federal electoral districts of Ontario
Federal electoral districts of Toronto